Lucy Jane Bledsoe (born February 1, 1957 in Portland, Oregon, United States) is a novelist who has received many awards for her fiction, including two National Science Foundation Artists & Writers Fellowships, a California Arts Council Fellowship, a Yaddo Fellowship, the American Library Association Stonewall Award, the Arts & Letters Fiction Prize, the Saturday Evening Post Fiction Award, the Sherwood Anderson Prize for Fiction, two Pushcart nominations, and the Devil's Kitchen Fiction Award. She is a six-time finalist for the Lambda Literary Award and a three-time finalist for the Ferro-Grumley Award.

Bledsoe loves teaching workshops, cooking, traveling anywhere, basketball, doing anything outside, and telling stories. She's traveled to Antarctica three times, as a two-time recipient of the National Science Foundation’s Artists & Writers in Antarctica Fellowship and once as a guest on the Russian ship, the Akademik Sergey Vavilov. She is one of a tiny handful of people who have stayed at all three American stations in Antarctica. She has also stayed in a number of field camps, both on the coast and in the Transantarctic mountains, where scientists are studying penguins, climate change, and the Big Bang. As a social justice activist, she's most recently been working on voting rights.

Bledsoe's autobiographical Young Adult novel, NO STOPPING US NOW, about love, basketball, and activism, will be out in April 2022.

Biography

Bledsoe was born into a large family in Portland, Oregon, United States, where she grew up. Bledsoe stated in an interview that she started writing stories when she was young and had always wanted to become a writer. She was inspired to write professionally by her high school Language Arts teacher. Bledsoe began her activism in high school, campaigning for the Portland Public Schools to be in compliance with Title IX. Her high school basketball team won the Oregon State Championship in 1975. From 1975 to 1977, Bledsoe attended Williams College. She earned a B.A. at University of California at Berkeley in 1979.

Career and honors

Bledsoe writes both fiction and non-fiction books, and for both children and adults. Bledsoe has said that her works are influenced by many authors, among them James Baldwin, Willa Cather, Adrienne Rich, and Barbara Kingsolver. Bledsoe often writes about the intersection of family, wilderness, and survival.

In 1985, she received the PEN Syndicated Fiction Award. In 1995, Bledsoe published Sweat: Stories and a Novella, which helped her garner her first Lambda Literary Award finalist title. In 1997, she wrote her first adult novel Working Parts, for which she received the 1998 Stonewall Book Award - the American Library Association Gay/Lesbian/Bisexual Award for Literature. In 2002, Bledsoe was awarded a California Arts Council fellowship in literature.

Bledsoe's 2002 children's book Hoop Girlz, which is about a ten-year-old girl who loves playing basketball but doesn't make the school team, was selected as one of Booklist 's Top 10 Sports Books for Youth of the year and featured among Core Collection: Sports Fiction for Girls.

Bledsoe has travelled to Antarctica three times and written four books about Antarctica: The Big Bang Symphony; The Ice Cave: A Woman's Adventures from the Mojave to the Antarctic; How to Survive in Antarctica; and The Antarctic Scoop.

Bledsoe has written science curriculum for National Geographic and several other educational organizations, including the George Lucas Educational Foundation and the SETI Institute. From 1997 to 2003, she taught creative writing in the Masters of Creative Writing Graduate Program at the University of San Francisco.

Bledsoe's books and stories have been translated into Japanese, Chinese, Spanish, German, and Dutch. She has been given two National Science Foundation artist and writers in Antarctica fellowships.

Criticism
Bledsoe's novels have been widely reviewed, including the following comments:

"It triumphs as an intimate and humane evocation of day-to-day life under inhumane circumstances." —New York Times Book Review

"Riveting new collection...fully realized characters; stories that stick to your ribs." —Toronto Star

"Stirring and deeply felt." —Kirkus Reviews

"Empowering and bold." —Publishers Weekly

"Bledsoe's novel is an absolute wonder. Combining a McCullers-like facility in letting her settings tell half the story with characterization and dialogue worthy of Harper Lee." —New York Journal of Books

"Berkeley author Lucy Jane Bledsoe shows the sexy side of the 1950s in her new novel, A Thin Bright Line." —San Francisco Chronicle

"Author Lucy Jane Bledsoe is an impressively gifted novelist." —Midwest Book Review

"Fabulous feminist fiction." —Ms. Magazine

"A magnificent, searingly beautiful book, as insightful as it is compassionate." —Elizabeth Percer, All Stories Are Love Stories

Writings

Books for adults
Sweat: Stories and a Novella, 1995.
Working Parts (novel), 1997.
This Wild Silence (novel), 2003.
The Ice Cave: A Woman's Adventures from the Mojave to the Antarctic (nonfiction), 2006.
Biting the Apple (novel), 2007.
The Big Bang Symphony (novel), 2010.
A Thin Bright Line (novel), 2016.
The Evolution of Love (novel), 2018.
Lava Falls: Stories,  2018.
Books for children
The Big Bike Race, 1995.
Tracks in the Snow, 1997.
Cougar Canyon, 2001.
Hoop Girlz, 2002.
The Antarctic Scoop, 2003.
How to Survive in Antarctica (nonfiction), 2005.
Running Wild,  2019.
No Stopping Us Now (young adult novel), 2022.

References

External links
 Official website

1957 births
Living people
20th-century American novelists
American women novelists
American science writers
American lesbian writers
21st-century American novelists
American LGBT novelists
Women science writers
20th-century American women writers
21st-century American women writers
American women non-fiction writers
20th-century American non-fiction writers
21st-century American non-fiction writers
Stonewall Book Award winners